Nick Gates (born November 27, 1995) is an American football center for the Washington Commanders of the National Football League (NFL). He played college football at Nebraska and signed with the New York Giants as an undrafted free agent in 2018.

Early years
Gates attended Bishop Gorman High School in Las Vegas, Nevada. He played baseball and football in high school. At 6'4 and 270 pounds, Gates was ranked as a four-star recruit. He committed to play football for the Nebraska Cornhuskers in January 2014.

College career
After redshirting as a freshman in 2014, Gates started 2015 at tackle on the offensive line. After his redshirt junior season in 2017, he declared for the 2018 NFL Draft. He played in 35 games for Nebraska in three years.

Professional career

NFL Combine

New York Giants

Gates signed with the New York Giants as an undrafted free agent on May 11, 2018. He spent his rookie season on injured reserve.

The Giants gave Gates a two-year, $6.825 million contract extension on August 1, 2020. In the 2020 season, Gates started at center where he did not allow a sack. On September 6, 2021, the Giants announced Gates as a captain for the 2021 season.

On September 16, 2021, Gates suffered a season-ending lower-leg fracture in the first quarter of the Thursday Night Football game against the Washington Football Team. He underwent surgery the next day. Gates had seven surgeries to repair both his broken tibia and fibula in his left leg.

On August 23, 2022, Gates was placed on the reserve/PUP list to start the season. On October 26, 2022, Gates was activated from the PUP list.

Washington Commanders
On March 16, 2023, Gates signed a three-year contract with the Washington Commanders.

References

External links
Washington Commanders bio
Nebraska Cornhuskers bio

1995 births
Living people
American football centers
American football offensive guards
American football offensive tackles
Nebraska Cornhuskers football players
New York Giants players
Players of American football from Nevada
Sportspeople from Las Vegas
Ed Block Courage Award recipients
Washington Commanders players